Maharaj Singh Bharti  was an Indian politician. He was elected to the Lok Sabha, the lower house of the Parliament of India from the Meerut constituency of Uttar Pradesh as a member of the Samyukta Socialist Party.

References

External links
  Official biographical sketch in Parliament of India website

1918 births
Samyukta Socialist Party politicians
Lok Sabha members from Uttar Pradesh
India MPs 1967–1970